is a city located in Kumamoto Prefecture, Japan.

As of March 31, 2017, Amakusa has an estimated population of 83,082 and a population density of 120 persons per km2. Amakusa has the distinction of being the fastest depopulating city in Japan since the last census (2005).

Amakusa covers the majority of two main islands, Kamishima (上島, "Upper Island") and Shimoshima (下島, "Lower Island") (天草諸島), and six smaller islands and islets. The modern city of Amakusa was established on March 27, 2006, from a merger between the former cities of Hondo and Ushibuka, and the towns of Amakusa , Ariake, Goshoura, Itsuwa, Kawaura, Kuratake, Shinwa and Sumoto from Amakusa District.

Amakusa Airlines is headquartered in Amakusa.

Geography

Climate
Amakusa has a humid subtropical climate (Köppen climate classification Cfa) with hot summers and cool winters. Precipitation is significant throughout the year, and is heaviest from May to August.

Demographics
Per Japanese census data, the population of Amakusa in 2020 is 75,783 people. Amakusa has been conducting censuses since 1920.

Tourism

Sightseeing Spots
Alegria Gardens 
Amakusa Christian Museum
Amakusa Dolphin Marine Land 
Ōe Catholic Church
Sakitsu Church
Shimoda Onsen hot springs

Notable people
Sunao Sonoda, statesman
Hiroyuki Sonoda, statesman
Kundō Koyama, film writer
Michiko Ishimure, writer
Tochihikari Masayuki, sumo wrestler
Yoshiki Tanaka, novelist
Kenta Matsumoto, vocalist and bassist of WANIMA
Koushin Nishida, guitarist of WANIMA

Sister Cities

 Encinitas, California, United States

References

External links 

  
 

Cities in Kumamoto Prefecture